Grupo Latin Vibe is a Salsa/Latin Jazz group established in New York.

Originally known as “TNT MIX”, Anibal “Tito” Rivera and Tommy Mattioli embarked on a musical journey, when they met in the 90's, later reducing the band to 7 pieces now known as Grupo Latin Vibe. The group has appeared with José Alberto "El Canario", Ray Sepúlveda and others.

In the Spring of 2003, they released their first CD, titled “Mambo City” which received great reviews locally and internationally. In July 2005, the group released its second CD, titled “All That Vibe”, and in the spring of 2007 its 3rd production, "Amanacer". Its most famous hit is "La Llave".

Band members
 Tommy Mattioli
 Awilda Mercedes Santiago
 Anibal "Tito" Rivera
 Orlando (Landy) Felix
 William Paul Rodriguez
 Ruben (Bongo) Rosa
 Charly Rodriguez

Discography
2007:  Amanecer 
"Lady Mambo"
"Ramona La Bailadora"
"Amanecer"
"Olvidalo"
"Tommy's Guajira"
"Me Voy Pa' La Rumba"
"Acariciame"
"Hindsight"
"Por Tu Amor"
"Tu No Vas"
"Esto Es Amor"
"Echa Pa' Ca"

2005:  All That vibe 
"Pa' Los Bravos"
"Si Tu Bailas"
"Rico Cha Cha Cha"
"Ritmo Pa' Borinquen"
"La Llave", The Key
"No Te Vayas Ramon"
"Llego El Rumbero"
"Can't Get Enough"
"Conquistar Tu Corazon"
"Aprieta El Bongo"
"La Fiesta Ya Comenso"
"All That Vibe"

2003:  Mambo City 
"Maria Cervantes" (ASCAP)
"Bombele" (BMI)
"Lo Que Me Pasa"
"El Cuarto de Tula"
"Mambo City"
"Besame Mucho" (BMI)
"Buscando Una Novia"
"Cuidate Compay" (BMI)
"Lagrimas Negras" (BMI)
"Descarga Latin Vibe"

External links
Official Website
More Information and Music

Salsa music groups
Musical groups established in 1990